Perecherla is a village in Guntur district of the Indian state of Andhra Pradesh. It is located in Medikonduru mandal of Guntur revenue division.

Geography 

Demographics 

Governance 

Perecherla gram panchayat is the local self-government of the village. It is divided into wards and each ward is represented by a ward member. The village forms a part of Andhra Pradesh Capital Region and is under the jurisdiction of APCRDA.

Education 

As per the school information report for the academic year 2018–19, the village has a total of 19 schools. These include 9 Zilla Parishad/MPP and 10 private schools.

See also 
List of villages in Guntur district

References 

Towns in Guntur district